Shishira is an Indian Kannada film starring Yashas and Meghana. It is directed by debutante Manju Swaraj. It also stars veteran actress Prema in an important The movie is based on the 2004 movie 1408.

Cast
 Prema
 Yashas as Suraj
 Meghana
 Santhosh

Soundtrack

B. Ajaneesh Loknath has scored the music.

Reception

Critical response 

R G Vijayasarathy of Rediff.com scored the film at 3.5 out of 5 stars and wrote "Yashas, who has acted earlier in Yuga Yugagale Saagali, comes out with a brilliant performance. He is definitely a talent to watch out for. Prema, who returns to the film industry after a while, fills the role perfectly. The tall Santosh is quite frightening in the film. Meghana and the other artistes are impressive. Go and watch Shishira". B S Srivani from Deccan Herald wrote "Ajanish Lokanath’s tunes have a part in this. Perhaps, this was what the director had intended. ‘Shishira’ is a slick film technically and story-wise as well. It doesn’t scare people.
Experience and patience will definitely help Manju". A critic from Bangalore Mirror wrote  "You are hardly ever scared by the ghosts that appear. The quick narrative does not seem special in the absence of excitement. The film is a commendable effort and a decent watch but is short of being stimulating". A critic from Sify.com wrote "Yashas has the looks and struggled hard to make it convincing. Prema in her come back is not impressive. The brilliant thing about the film is the Suresh Babu Camera work, special effects and Ajanish Lokanth two lovely tunes and the background score done for the film".

References

2009 films
2000s Kannada-language films
Indian remakes of American films
Films directed by Manju Swaraj